Joseph Carl Price (born January 13, 1973) is an American football coach and former player. He was a third round NFL draft pick and the current co-defensive line coach at Virginia Tech. Price was promoted to interim head coach on November 16, 2021 after the firing of Justin Fuente. His team beat rival Virginia 29–24 on the road to become bowl eligible.

When Virginia Tech announced that Brent Pry had been hired to succeed Fuente, it was announced that Price would remain on Pry's staff as the associate head coach and defensive line coach.

Before joining Virginia Tech in 2021, he was an assistant for close to twenty years at Marshall and James Madison.

Head coaching record

References

External links
 Virginia Tech profile

1973 births
Living people
American football defensive linemen
Coaches of American football from Maryland
James Madison Dukes football coaches
Marshall Thundering Herd football coaches
Players of American football from Maryland
Virginia Tech Hokies football players
Virginia Tech Hokies football coaches
High school football coaches in Virginia
People from Calvert County, Maryland